Transcription initiation factor IIA subunit 1 is a protein that in humans is encoded by the GTF2A1 gene.

Interactions 

GTF2A1 has been shown to interact with TATA binding protein and TBPL1.

See also 
 Transcription Factor II A

Model organisms 

Model organisms have been used in the study of GTF2A1 function. A conditional knockout mouse line called Gtf2a1tm1a(KOMP)Wtsi was generated at the Wellcome Trust Sanger Institute. Male and female animals underwent a standardized phenotypic screen to determine the effects of deletion. Additional screens performed:  - In-depth immunological phenotyping

References

Further reading 

 
 
 
 
 
 
 
 
 
 
 
 
 
 
 
 
 
 
 

Transcription factors